Trevor Thurling (born 26 April 1984) is an Australian former professional rugby league footballer who played in the 2000s and 2010s.

Playing career
Thurling was born in Queanbeyan, New South Wales and played his junior football with the Queanbeyan United Blues. While attending Dickson College in the Australian Capital Territory in 2001, Thurling was selected to play for the Australian Schoolboys team.

As 2004 NRL premiers, Canterbury faced Super League IX champions, Leeds in the 2005 World Club Challenge. Thurling played from the interchange bench in the Canterbury's 32-39 loss.

Thurling was involved in a car accident on 9 April 2009 in Sydney. Police allege he was under the influence of alcohol at the time of the accident and the Canberra club stood Thurling down from his playing commitments.

References

External links

Canberra Raiders profile
Bulldogs profile
NRL profile

1984 births
Living people
Australian rugby league players
Canterbury-Bankstown Bulldogs players
Canberra Raiders players
Mount Pritchard Mounties players
Rugby league props
Rugby league second-rows
Rugby league players from Queanbeyan